William Morse (born May 1852, date of death unknown) was a United States Navy sailor and a recipient of the United States military's highest decoration, the Medal of Honor.

Biography
Born in May 1852 in Hamburg, Germany, Morse immigrated to the United States and joined the Navy from New York. On that day, while Shenandoah was at Rio de Janeiro, Brazil, he and Seaman John Smith jumped overboard and rescued First Class Fireman James Grady from drowning. For this action, both Morse and Smith were awarded the Medal of Honor four years later, on October 18, 1884.

Morse's official Medal of Honor citation reads:
or jumping overboard from the U.S.S. Shenandoah at Rio de Janeiro Brazil, 19 September 1880, and rescuing from drowning James Grady, first class fireman.

See also

List of Medal of Honor recipients in non-combat incidents

References

External links

1852 births
Year of death missing
German emigrants to the United States
United States Navy sailors
United States Navy Medal of Honor recipients
German-born Medal of Honor recipients
Military personnel from Hamburg
Non-combat recipients of the Medal of Honor